The McPherson Bulldogs football program is a college football team that represents McPherson College in the Kansas Collegiate Athletic Conference, a part of the NAIA.  The team has had 30 head coaches since its first recorded football game in 1920.

Pete Sterbick began with the program starting the 2012 season and resigned at the end of the 2013 season.  On December 5, 2013, McPherson announced that defensive coordinator Steve Fox was promoted to head coach.  Fox resigned after one season to take a position as assistant coach at Cisco College where he can be near his family.

In December 2014, McPherson hired Paul Mierkiewicz as the 30th head coach of the program.

Key

Coaches
School records of the program go back to 1920, but other records show a player named Pop Hollinger played football for McPherson in 1917 or earlier.  It is possible that records are incorrect, incomplete, or that there was no official coach before the 1920 season.

See also

 List of people from McPherson County, Kansas

Notes

References

Lists of college football head coaches

Kansas sports-related lists